Guillén Pérez de Guzmán (ca. 1180–1233), a member of the House of Guzmán, one of the most aristocratic of the Kingdom of Castile,  was the maternal grandfather of Queen Beatrice of Castile, Queen Consort of Portugal as the wife of King Alfonso III. His father was Pedro Rodríguez de Guzmán—killed in the Battle of Alarcos on July 18, 1195and son of Rodrigo Muñoz de Guzmán—and Mahalda With his brothers Nuño and Theobald, he fought alongside King Alfonso VIII at the decisive Battle of Navas de Tolosa in 1212. Even though his kinsmen supported the Laras during the crisis that ensued after the death of King Alfonso VIII, Guillén, probably because of his marriage to a member of the Girón clan, supported Queen Berengaria of Castile and her son, the future king Ferdinand III.

Marriage and issue 

He married, probably before 1217 and certainly before May 1222, María González Girón daughter of Gonzalo Rodríguez Girón and Sancha Rodríguez. María, after the death of her husband Guillén, married Gil Vasques de Soverosa, with issue. Guillén Pérez de Guzmán and his wife María were the parents of:  

 Nuño Guillén de Guzmán, married to Teresa Álvarez de Manzanedo
 Pedro Núñez de Guzmán, adelantado mayor of Castile and father of Alonso Pérez de Guzmán.
 Mayor Guillén de Guzmán, mistress of King Alfonso X of Castile with whom he had a daughter, Beatrice of Castile, the wife of King Afonso III of Portugal.

Notes

References

Bibliography 

 

 
 
 
 
 

1180s births
1233 deaths
13th-century Castilian nobility